The Pitchfork Music Festival 2016 was held on July 15 to 17, 2016 at the Union Park, Chicago, United States. The festival lineup was announced on February 19, 2016.

Lineup
Artists listed from latest to earliest set times.

Notes

References

External links

2016 music festivals
Pitchfork Music Festival